Strictispiridae is a taxonomic family of small predatory sea snails, marine gastropod mollusks in the superfamily Conoidea, the cone snails and their allies.

This family has no subfamilies.

Since 2018, this family has been included in the family Pseudomelatomidae.

Genera 
Genera in the family Strictispiridae used to include:
Cleospira McLean, 1971
 Cleospira bicolor (Sowerby I, 1834)
 Cleospira ochsneri (Hertlein & Strong, 1949)
 Strictispira McLean, 1971
  † Strictispira acurugata (Dall, 1890)
 Strictispira coltrorum Tippett, 2006
 Strictispira drangai (Schwengel, 1951) 
 Strictispira ericana (Hertlein & Strong, 1951)
 Strictispira paxillus (Reeve, 1845)
 Strictispira redferni Tippett, 2006
 Strictispira stillmani Shasky, 1971
 Species brought into synonymy
 Strictispira solida (C. B. Adams, 1850) : synonym of Clathrodrillia solida (C. B. Adams, 1850)

References

 Tippett, D. L. "The genus Strictispira in the western Atlantic (Gastropoda: Conoidea)." Malacologia 48.1-2 (2006): 43-64.

External links
  Abdelkrim J., Aznar-Cormano L., Fedosov A., Kantor Y., Lozouet P., Phuong M., Zaharias P. & Puillandre N. (2018). Exon-capture based phylogeny and diversification of the venomous gastropods (Neogastropoda, Conoidea). Molecular Biology and Evolution. 35(10): 2355-2374